By-elections to the 30th Canadian Parliament were held to fill vacancies in the House of Commons of Canada between the 1974 federal election and the 1979 federal election. The Liberal Party of Canada led a majority government for the entirety of the 30th Canadian Parliament, though their number did decrease from by-elections.

27 seats became vacant during the life of the Parliament. 25 of these vacancies were filled through by-elections, and 2 seats remained vacant when the 1979 federal election was called.

See also
List of federal by-elections in Canada

Sources
 Parliament of Canada–Elected in By-Elections 

1978 elections in Canada
1977 elections in Canada
1976 elections in Canada
1975 elections in Canada
30th